Sharga can refer to the following places in Mongolia:
Sharga sum, a sum of Govi-Altai aimag;
Sharga, official name of the Tsagaan-Uul sum center (in Khövsgöl);
Sharga Nature Reserve, a reserve in the western part of Mongolia.

See also

Sharla